Violet McNeish Kay (18 June 1914 – 1971) was a Scottish artist who painted landscapes in oils and watercolours.

Biography
Kay was born in Glasgow where her father, James Kay was an established artist.
Violet Kay studied at the Glasgow School of Art between 1931 and 1933 and joined the Glasgow Society of Lady Artists in 1935 and later, in 1948, won their Lauder Award. She was elected a member of the Royal Scottish Watercolour Society in 1948 and regularly exhibited with that Society and also showed some sixty paintings with the Royal Glasgow Institute of the Fine Arts and showed at least once with the Aberdeen Artists Society. Both the Pilgrim Trust and the local authority in Paisley purchased examples of her work. Kay lived at Garelochhead and often painted landscapes of the Scottish west coast using bold areas of strong colours. She died at Helensburgh.

References

External links

1914 births
1971 deaths
20th-century Scottish painters
20th-century Scottish women artists
Alumni of the Glasgow School of Art
Artists from Glasgow
Scottish women painters